Chamaedorea ernesti-augusti is species of small palm tree. It was first described scientifically in 1852 by Hermann Wendland. It is one of several species with leaves that are harvested as xate.

References

ernesti-augusti
Plants described in 1852